99 Francs is a 2007 French satirical film directed by Jan Kounen and written by Nicolas & Bruno. Based on the novel 99 Francs, by Frédéric Beigbeder, the film stars Jean Dujardin. The film released on 26 September 2007 in France.

Plot
The film is a satire on the modern advertisement business. The plot mainly concerns the story of a commercial advertisement designer, Octave Parango (Jean Dujardin), who has an easy-going, highly paid job, and an active free life mainly consisting of drugs and random one-time sexual encounters. However, he starts growing weary of his job, and after having his first ever long-time relationship with fellow worker Sophie (Vahina Giocante) fail miserably, he organises a revolt against the advertisement business and his own life.

Cast
 Jean Dujardin
 Vahina Giocante
 Elisa Tovati
 Nicolas Marié
 Antoine Basler

References

External links
 
 
 

2007 films
French satirical films
2000s French-language films
Films directed by Jan Kounen
Films about drugs
Films about advertising
Films shot in Venezuela
Films based on works by French writers
2000s French films